The American-founded African Methodist Episcopal Church's 14th district covers Benin, Côte d'Ivoire, Ghana, Liberia, Nigeria, Sierra Leone and Togo. It has a significant presence in Nigeria. The bishop of the 14th district is since July 2016 Bishop E. Earl McCloud, Jr. from United States.

Nigeria
In Nigeria, the rise of Boko Haram has displaced churches of the AME Zion denomination and threatened their viability.

See also
Christianity in Nigeria
Protestantism in Nigeria
List of AME Churches
African Methodist Episcopal Church

References

African Methodist Episcopal Church
Methodism in Nigeria